Dirk Fok van Slooten (1891, Amersfoort, the Netherlands – 1953, Amsterdam, the Netherlands) was a Dutch botanist. He obtained a doctorate from Utrecht University in 1919. In 1948 he became acting director of the Buitenzorg Botanical Gardens (now Bogor Botanical Gardens) in Java.

Van Slooten named over 130 plant species, including species such as Dipterocarpus borneensis. The species Shorea slootenii is named for him.

Selected bibliography
 The Flacourtiaceae of the Dutch East Indies, 1925
 The Dipterocarpaceae of the Dutch East Indies, 1926
 Ridley and the Flora of the Netherlands Indies, 1935

References

1891 births
1953 deaths
20th-century Dutch botanists
Utrecht University alumni
People from Amersfoort